Nikos Stathopoulos (born 8 November 1943) is a Greek former professional footballer who played as left midfielder and a later manager.

Club career
Stathopoulos started football in 1956, when he joined the academies of AEK Athens. In 1963 he was promoted to the youth team and two years later, he joined the men's team. On 1 May 1966 he made his debut in a home match against Panionios, where he took him just 11 minutes to score his first goal and open the score for his team in a game that eventually ended in an imposing 5–1 win. He established himself quickly at the club, playing by convention as a left-back, becoming the most modern full-back in Greece in the 60s. He was essentially a left midfielder with high technical skill, speed and crosses, who was often used on the left side of the defense due to the offensive game of AEK. He was a pioneer for the position and far ahead of his time in football, since he was one of the few backs with assists and goals in their repertoire, while he also was one of the first players who did the overlap in times when it was an unknown concept for Greek football. A key member of the team that won second place in the Balkans Cup in 1967, losing only in the final by Fenerbahçe. He was also one of the main players in the squad that reached the quarter-finals of the European Cup in 1969. On 23 December 1973 he scored a brace in a home match against Apollon Athens shaping the final 4–1 for his team. He spent most of his career at AEK, winning 2 Championships and 1 Cup. In the summer of 1974 he left the club somewhat inelegantly, as a part of the renewal of the team's roster, decided by both the new president of the club, Loukas Barlos and the manager, František Fadrhonc

Afterwards, he signed for Apollon Athens, where he played in the second division and won the championship of the 2nd group and the promotion. The following season, he was acquired by Proodeftiki, playing for 2 seasons in the second division and then he played for 1 season at Korinthos, before moving to Panegialios, where he won the south group of the second division in 1979. Then, in 1980, he took over as a player-coach at Ilioupoli, where he retired as footballer in 1984.

International career
Stathopoulos played a total of 12 times with Greece, from 1969 to 1971. He made his debut on 4 May 1969 in a 2–2 draw away from home against Portugal for the 1970 FIFA World Cup qualifiers, where he replaced Babis Intzoglou under the instructions of Dan Georgiadis.

Managerial career
Stathopoulos worked as a coach in clubs of lower tears, such as Diagoras Aigaleo and Marko.

Honours

AEK Athens
Alpha Ethniki: 1967–68, 1970–71
Greek Cup: 1965–66

Apollon Athens
Beta Ethniki: 1974–75 (2nd Group)

Korinthos
Beta Ethniki: 1978–79 (South Group)

References

1943 births
Living people
Greek footballers
Greece international footballers
Super League Greece players
AEK Athens F.C. players
Apollon Smyrnis F.C. players
Proodeftiki F.C. players
Korinthos F.C. players
Panegialios F.C. players
Ilioupoli F.C. players
Association football midfielders
Greek football managers
Footballers from Lamia (city)